Siccia microsticta is a moth in the family Erebidae. It was described by George Hampson in 1914. It is found in Ghana.

References

Endemic fauna of Ghana
Moths described in 1914
Nudariina